This is a list of the most expensive transfer fees paid in football in The Netherlands.

Outgoing transfers

Incoming transfers

World Football Transfer Records

References

Transfer records
Transfer records
Record
Netherlands
Transfer record
Football transfer record